Football Kingz Football Club, an association football club based in Auckland, was founded in 1999. They were admitted into the National Soccer League for the 1999–2000 season until the club folded in 2004.

Harry Ngata held the record for the greatest number of appearances for Football Kingz. The New Zealand midfielder played 123 times for the club. The club's goalscoring record was also held by Harry Ngata who scored 29 goals.

Key
 The list is ordered first by date of debut, and then if necessary in alphabetical order.
 Appearances as a substitute are included.

Players

References
General
 
 

Specific

Football Kingz FC players
Football Kingz
Association football player non-biographical articles